1 Train may refer to:
1 (New York City Subway service)
"1 Train" (song), a song by ASAP Rocky
Green Line (Montreal Metro), also known as Line 1
Paris Métro Line 1
Line 1 (Beijing Subway)
Line 1 (Shanghai Metro)

See also
Line 1 (disambiguation)